Leucocharis is a genus of air-breathing land snails, terrestrial pulmonate gastropod mollusks in the subfamily Placostylinae of the family Bothriembryontidae.

Species
Species within the genus Leucpcharis include: (extinct species are marked with a dagger †)
Leucocharis loyaltiensis (Souverbie, 1879)
 Leucocharis pancheri (Crosse, 1870)
Leucocharis porphyrocheila Dautzenberg & Bernier, 1901

References

 Neubert, E., Chérel-Mora C. & Bouchet P. (2009). Polytypy, clines, and fragmentation: The bulimes of New Caledonia revisited (Pulmonata, Orthalicoidea, Placostylidae). In P. Grancolas (ed.), Zoologia Neocaledonica 7. Biodiversity studies in New Caledonia. Mémoires du Muséum National d'Histoire Naturelle. 198: 37-131.

External links
 Nomenclator Zoologicus info
 Pilsbry, H. A. (1900). Manual of conchology, structural and systematic, with illustrations of the species. Ser. 2, Pulmonata. Vol. 13: Australasian Bulimulidae: Bothriembryon, Placostylus. Helicidae: Amphidromus. pp 1-253, pls 1-72. Philadelphia, published by the Conchological Section, Academy of Natural Sciences

 
Orthalicidae
Taxa named by Henry Augustus Pilsbry
Gastropod genera
Taxonomy articles created by Polbot